Kira Kattenbeck (born 2 August 1992) is a German badminton player. She started playing badminton at aged 8 in Emsdetten, and joined Germany national badminton team in 2011. In 2011, she won gold medal at the European Junior Badminton Championships in mixed team event.

Achievements

European Games
Mixed Doubles

BWF International Challenge/Series
Women's Doubles

Mixed Doubles

 BWF International Challenge tournament
 BWF International Series tournament
 BWF Future Series tournament

References

External links
 

1992 births
Living people
People from Steinfurt
Sportspeople from Münster (region)
German female badminton players
Badminton players at the 2015 European Games
European Games bronze medalists for Germany
European Games medalists in badminton